Clerkenwell Films is a British film and television production company. Formed in 1998 by producer Murray Ferguson and actor John Hannah, the company has created television shows for both UK and international broadcasters and streaming platforms, including the BBC, ITV, Channel 4, E4, Sky, Hulu and Netflix. On 19 January 2021, BBC Studios took full control wholly acquiring the company.

Among its credits are:

 The End Of The F***ing World for Channel 4 & Netflix
 Cheaters for the BBC
 Misfits for E4, Channel 4 & Hulu
The Aliens for E4 & Channel 4
 Lovesick for Netflix
 The Nightmare Worlds of HG Wells for Sky 
  Not Safe For Work for Channel 4
 Initial adaptations of the Rebus novels for ITV
 Afterlife for ITV
 Persuasion for ITV 
 The Diary of a Nobody adapted by House of Cards creator Andrew Davies for the BBC

References

External links
Clerkenwell Films official site

Television production companies of the United Kingdom
Mass media companies established in 1998
British companies established in 1998
2021 mergers and acquisitions